Alexander McPherson Scott (3 November 1906 – 12 August 1989) was an Australian rules footballer who played with South Melbourne in the Victorian Football League (VFL).

Notes

External links 

1906 births
1989 deaths
Australian rules footballers from Melbourne
Sydney Swans players
Moorabbin Football Club players
People from Cheltenham, Victoria